The 2017 Fred Page Cup was the 23rd Canadian Eastern Junior A Ice Hockey Championship for the Canadian Junior Hockey League. The Terrebonne Cobras hosted for the second time in team history. The tournament was held May 3 to May 7 at La Cite du Sport in Terrebonne, Quebec. The Carleton Place Canadians of the CCHL entered the tournament as the 3-time defending champions. The tournament champions qualified for the 2017 Royal Bank Cup, held in Cobourg, Ontario and hosted by the OJHL's Cobourg Cougars at the Cobourg Community Centre.

Teams
Terrebonne Cobras (Host and LHJQ Champions )
Regular Season: 44-5-0 (1st LHJQ Alexandre Burrows Division)
Playoffs: Defeated Princeville (4-0), Defeated St-Leonard (4-1), Defeated Longueuil (4-1) to win the league.
Longueuil Collège Français (QJHL Runner-Up)
Regular Season: 43-4-2 (1st LHJQ Martin St-Louis Division)
Playoffs: Defeated Sainte-Agathe (4-1), Defeated Granby (4-2),  Defeated by Terrebonne (1-4).
Truro Bearcats (MHL Champion)
Regular Season: 35-13-2 (2nd MHL South Division)
Playoffs: Defeated Yarmouth (4-1), Defeated  Amherst (4-1), Defeated Miramichi (4-3) to win league.
Carleton Place Canadians (CCHL Champion)
Regular Season: 50-12-0 (1st CCHL Robinson Division)
Playoffs: Defeated Nepean (4-1), Defeated Kemptville (4-2), Defeated Ottawa (4-1) to win league.

Tournament

Round Robin
x = Clinched championship round berth; y = Clinched first overall

Tie Breaker: Head-to-Head, then 3-way +/-.

Results

Semifinals and final

2016–17 in Canadian ice hockey
Fred Page Cup
Terrebonne, Quebec